The Paris Grays were a minor league baseball team that played in the East Texas League in 1923. The team, managed by Paul Trammell, finished first in the league standings that season and since there were no playoffs, it was the de facto league champion. It was based in Paris, Texas, United States.

References

Baseball teams established in 1923
Sports clubs disestablished in 1923
Defunct minor league baseball teams
Defunct baseball teams in Texas
1923 establishments in Texas
1923 disestablishments in Texas
Paris, Texas
Baseball teams disestablished in 1923
East Texas League teams